The Embassy of Sudan in Washington, D.C. is the diplomatic mission of the Republic of Sudan to the United States. It is located at 2210 Massachusetts Avenue, Northwest, Washington, D.C., in the Embassy Row neighborhood.

The Charge d'Affaires is John Ukec Lueth.

Events
Groups have been holding monthly vigils at the embassy, about the  Darfur conflict.

On March 16, 2012, actor George Clooney was arrested outside the embassy for civil disobedience.

References

External links
Official website

wikimapia

Sudan
Washington, D.C.
Sudan–United States relations
Sudan